Nata could refer to:


Places
 Nata, Botswana, a village in Central District of Botswana
 Nata, Cyprus, a small village near Paphos, Cyprus
 Natá, Coclé, a town and corregimiento in Natá District, Coclé Province, Panama
 Natá District,  a district of Coclé Province, Panama

Music
 Nata, a musical scale in Carnatic music (South Indian classical music)
 Nata (band), a hard rock band from Guadalajara (Mexico) founded by Galo Ochoa

Foods
 Nata can be translated into Portuguese and Spanish as milk skin, the creamy layer that builds on top of milk.
 Nata de coco, a jelly-like food common in East and Southeast Asia
 Pastel de nata, a Portuguese delicacy

Other
 NatA, the major eukaryotic N-terminal acetyltransferase
 Nata (deity), a Daoist protection deity
 National Aptitude Test in Architecture, a national examination for admission to undergraduate courses in architecture, India
 National Association of Testing Authorities, an Australian non-profit industry association that provides assessment, accreditation, and training services to laboratories and technical facilities
 National Athletic Trainers' Association, a professional membership association for certified athletic trainers in the US and Canada
 New Approach to Appraisal, a framework for assessing transport projects and proposals in the United Kingdom
 NewGrounds Annual Tournament of Animation, an animation competition

See also
 Natas (disambiguation)